The Yu-hsiu Museum of Art is an art museum in Caotun Township, Nantou County, Taiwan.

History
The museum was completed in October 2015, and opened in January 2016. The museum was then won the top prize of the 2016 Taiwan Architecture Award by Taiwan Architect Magazine.

Architecture
The museum building was designed by architect Liao Wei-li (廖偉立).

See also
 List of museums in Taiwan

References

2016 establishments in Taiwan
Art museums and galleries in Taiwan
Art museums established in 2016
Caotun Township
Museums in Nantou County